Secundino Suárez Vázquez (born 13 April 1955), known as Cundi, is a Spanish retired footballer who played as a left-back.

His professional career was intimately connected with Sporting de Gijón, which he represented for 15 years.

Club career
Born in Sotrondio, Asturias, Cundi spent his professional career almost entirely with local powerhouse Sporting de Gijón, save for a one-year loan spell with UD Poblense due to compulsory military service. From the age of 20 onwards he was an undisputed starter for the La Liga club, appearing in nearly 400 competitive games during his 15-year spell.

In the 1986–87 season, Cundi played 41 matches (3,549 minutes) for an eventual fourth-place finish. He did not receive one single red card during his career.

International career
Cundi earned nine caps for the Spain national team in two and a half years, and was selected for UEFA Euro 1980. His debut came on 4 October 1978 in a Euro 1980 qualifier against Yugoslavia (2–1 loss in Zagreb).

Personal life
Cundi's son, Rubén, was also a footballer. An attacking midfielder, he also started out at Sporting de Gijón.

References

External links

1955 births
Living people
People from San Martín del Rey Aurelio
Spanish footballers
Footballers from Asturias
Association football defenders
La Liga players
Tercera División players
CD Ensidesa players
Sporting de Gijón players
Spain amateur international footballers
Spain B international footballers
Spain international footballers
UEFA Euro 1980 players
Olympic footballers of Spain
Footballers at the 1976 Summer Olympics